Zoës Kitchen is a Mediterranean Style restaurant chain that is a subsidiary of the Cava Group. Their headquarters are located in Plano, Texas, United States. By 2013, the chain grew to include over 200 locations across 17 states; however, the acquisition by Cava has resulted in a reduction in Zoe's locations (some replaced by Cava restaurants); as of late December 2022, 35 locations in 13 states remained. At the rate of closures shown in 2022 it is expected the chain will no longer be active sometime in 2023.

History
Zoës Kitchen was originally based in Homewood, Alabama in June 1995 as Zoe's Kitchen Inc. It was founded by Zoë and Marcus Cassimus. Originally, the restaurants were not franchised with Cassimus retaining a 51 percent ownership stake in all newly opened locations.

Its first location opened in October 1995 in downtown Homewood. A second location opened in the Riverchase section of Hoover in 1999, and a third in downtown Birmingham in March 2001. The restaurant continued its expansion with the opening of its first store outside the Birmingham area in Tuscaloosa in May 2001 and its first out of state location in Nashville, Tennessee in the fall of 2001. By 2006, Zoës had expanded to sixteen restaurants, with eight located in Alabama and others located in Phoenix, Nashville, Memphis, Baton Rouge and Destin.

With 20 stores open by 2007, Cassimus sold a majority ownership stake to Brentwood Associates of Los Angeles. Following the purchase, Cassimus announced that he would remain as chief executive. The company would still be headquartered in Birmingham, and the menu would not be affected. Additionally, it was revealed that the sale could potentially result in the opening of 200 new franchises over the next five years. By Spring 2008 GE Capital Solutions loaned the company ten million dollars to allow for the development of 50 new stores across the southeast and southwest.

In November 2008, Cassimus resigned with Greg Dollarhyde taking his place as CEO. Formerly the CEO of Baja Fresh, Dollarhyde announced that he would be looking to expand the restaurant to new locales with two-thirds remaining company owned and the remainder being franchised.

As of August 2011, Zoës has 11 franchised stores, and the rest are company-owned. President Kevin Miles announced that Zoës would consider multi-unit franchisees in the future.

Zoës launched online ordering in 2011 and a mobile loyalty app in 2013.

Miles promised that the company would stay headquartered in Birmingham in 2011. However, when the company announced that it was going to be publicly traded in 2014, SEC filings showed the headquarters as Plano, Texas. Reasons given for the shift included simplifying travel, a lack of talent available in Birmingham, and the need to consolidate offices to prepare for an IPO. Local media, business, and civic leaders said they were unaware of the move.

In August 2018, Zoës was acquired by Cava Group, Inc. for $12.75 in cash for each Zoës common share. Cava Group is a privately held Mediterranean restaurant chain.

On September 24, 2018, American Airlines announced that Zoe's Kitchen will be the primary food partner to serve the light snack and food items in their aircraft's main cabin seats.

In January 2023, Zoës closed their Crestline Village location in Mountain Brook, which made the downtown Birmingham location the last remaining Zoës in the Birmingham metro area. Two Birmingham locations were converted into CAVA franchises, including the original Homewood location. Shortly after the closure of the Crestline location, Cassimus announced that his family, in partnership with the Cava Group, would be taking over the Crestline location to bring back the original Zoës menu from 1995.

Locations
As of December 24, 2022, Zoës Kitchen had 35 locations in thirteen states.

References

External links
 
 Zoës Kitchen Corporate

Restaurants in Birmingham, Alabama
Economy of the Southeastern United States
Economy of the Southwestern United States
Restaurant chains in the United States
Fast-food chains of the United States
Restaurants established in 1995
1995 establishments in Alabama
Fast casual restaurants
Companies formerly listed on the New York Stock Exchange
Companies based in Plano, Texas
2014 initial public offerings
2018 mergers and acquisitions
Mediterranean restaurants